The 1866–67 United States Senate elections were held on various dates in various states. As these U.S. Senate elections were prior to the ratification of the Seventeenth Amendment in 1913, senators were chosen by state legislatures. Senators were elected over a wide range of time throughout 1866 and 1867, and a seat may have been filled months late or remained vacant due to legislative deadlock. In these elections, terms were up for the senators in Class 3.

The Republican Party gained two seats, as several of the Southern States were readmitted during Reconstruction, enlarging their majority.

Results summary 
Senate party division, 40th Congress (1867–1869)

 Majority party: Republican (57)
 Minority party: Democratic (9)
 Other parties: (0)
 Vacant: (6)
 Total seats: 72

Change in Senate composition

Before the elections 
After August 31, 1866 appointment in New Hampshire.

As a result of the elections

Beginning of the next Congress

Race summaries

Special elections during the 39th Congress 
In these special elections, the winners were seated during 1866 or in 1867 before March 4; ordered by election date.

Races leading to the 40th Congress 
In these regular elections, the winners were elected for the term beginning March 4, 1867; ordered by state.

All of the elections involved the Class 3 seats.

Elections during the 40th Congress

New York 

The New York election was held on January 15, 1867, by the New York State Legislature.  Republican Ira Harris had been elected in February 1861 to this seat, and his term would expire on March 3, 1867.

At the State election in November 1865, 27 Republicans and 5 Democrats were elected for a two-year term (1866-1867) in the State Senate. At the State election in November 1866, 82 Republicans and 46 Democrats were elected for the session of 1867 to the Assembly. The 90th State Legislature met from January 1 to April 20, 1867, at Albany, New York.

The caucus of Republican State legislators met on January 10, State Senator Charles J. Folger presided. State Senator Thomas Parsons (28th D.) was absent, but had his vote cast by proxy. They nominated Congressman Roscoe Conkling for the U.S. Senate. The incumbent Senator Ira Harris was voted down.

Notes: 
 On the fourth ballot, 110 votes were cast, one too many, and it was annulled.
 "wd" = name withdrawn

The caucus of the Democratic State legislators met also on January 10. State Senator Henry C. Murphy was nominated on the first ballot with 25 votes against 21 for Ex-D.A. of New York A. Oakey Hall. Roscoe Conkling was the choice of both the Assembly and the State Senate, and was declared elected.

Notes: 
 The vote for Ex-Chief Judge Comstock was cast by Henry C. Murphy.
 The votes were cast on January 15, but both Houses met in a joint session on January 16 to compare nominations, and declare the result.

Conkling was re-elected in 1873 and 1879, and remained in office until May 17, 1881, when he resigned in protest against the distribution of federal patronage in New York by President James A. Garfield without being consulted. The crisis between the Stalwart and the Half-Breed factions of the Republican party arose when the leader of the New Yorker Half-Breeds William H. Robertson was appointed Collector of the Port of New York, a position Conkling wanted to give to one of his Stalwart friends.

Pennsylvania 

The Pennsylvania election was held on January 15, 1867. Simon Cameron was elected by the Pennsylvania General Assembly.

Incumbent Republican Edgar Cowan, who was elected in 1861, was a candidate for re-election to another term, but was defeated by former Democratic Senator and former United States Secretary of War Simon Cameron, who had previously switched to the Republican Party. The Pennsylvania General Assembly, consisting of the House of Representatives and the Senate, convened on January 15, 1867, to elect a Senator to fill the term beginning on March 4, 1867. The results of the vote of both houses combined are as follows:

 |-
 |-bgcolor   = "#EEEEEE"
 | colspan    = "3" align= "right" | Totals
 | align      = "right" | 133
 | align      = "right" | 100.00%

See also
 1866 United States elections
 1866–67 United States House of Representatives elections
 39th United States Congress
 40th United States Congress

References

 
 
 Party Division in the Senate, 1789-Present, via Senate.gov
 The New York Civil List compiled by Franklin Benjamin Hough, Stephen C. Hutchins and Edgar Albert Werner, 1867 (see pg. 568 for U. S. Senators; pg. 444 for State Senators 1867; pg. 505f for Members of Assembly 1867)
 Members of the 40th United States Congress
 Result state election 1865 in The Tribune Almanac for 1866 compiled by Horace Greeley of the New York Tribune
 Result state election 1866 in The Tribune Almanac for 1867 compiled by Horace Greeley of the New York Tribune
 ...THE REPUBLICAN CAUCUS; Hon. Roscoe Conkling, of Oneida County, Nominated for United States Senator; ...DEMOCRATIC CAUCUS; Hon. Henry C. Murphy, of Kings County, Nominated for United States Senator in NYT on January 11, 1867
 Journal of the New York State Assembly (1867; pages 98f and 103)
 Journal of the New York State Senate (1867; pages 58f and 62)
 Pennsylvania Election Statistics: 1682-2006 from the Wilkes University Election Statistics Project